The 1971 Air Force Falcons football team represented the United States Air Force Academy as an independent during the 1971 NCAA University Division football season. Led by 14th-year head coach Ben Martin, the Falcons compiled a record of 6–4 and tied in scoring with their opponents, 187–187. Air Force played their home games at Falcon Stadium in Colorado Springs, Colorado.

The previous season ended in the Sugar Bowl in New Orleans on New Year's Day. The 1971 Falcons began at 5–1 and were No. 18 in the AP Poll in late October, but lost three of their final four games, fell out of the polls, and did not play in the postseason.

This was the last season that Navy was not on the Falcons' schedule. The Commander-in-Chief's Trophy was introduced in 1972 and matched the three military academies annually. Previously, Air Force played Navy in even years and Army in odd years.

Schedule

Personnel

References

Air Force
Air Force Falcons football seasons
Air Force Falcons football